Old Oak Common (OOC) is a railway station under construction on the site of the Old Oak Common traction maintenance depot to the west of London in Old Oak Common, approximately  south of Willesden Junction station.

The new station is part of the High Speed 2 line from London to Birmingham, covered by the High Speed Rail (London - West Midlands) Act 2017. This hybrid bill conferred powers to construct and maintain phase 1, including intermediate stations. The surrounding area, including possible above-station development, is controlled by the Old Oak and Park Royal Development Corporation set up in April 2015.

The station will provide a major transport interchange with a number of other main line and commuter rail services, including the Elizabeth line and other services on the Great Western Main Line. The High Speed 2 line will be below ground level at the Old Oak Common site, with the parallel Great Western Main Line tracks on the surface to the south.

Site and design

The site of the Old Oak Common interchange station is to the north of Wormwood Scrubs and the south of Willesden Junction, alongside the existing Great Western Main Line. The site formerly contained the EWS train maintenance site to the north, which was converted into a construction equipment marshalling area for the Crossrail project. Also on the site are the Elizabeth line's Old Oak Common Traction Maintenance Depot and the Great Western Railway North Pole depot for Intercity Express Programme trains.

The new High Speed 2 station at Old Oak Common is planned to act as a catalyst for the regeneration of this neglected part of West London, acting as a gateway to the development of a new neighbourhood adjacent to the site, creating tens of thousands of new homes, and integrated into the local area through urban design that maximises green space and the station's connection with local bus, cycling and walking routes.

The "super-hub" station will have 14 platforms. It will have 44 escalators and 52 lifts, and will have a naturally-lit concourse to create a pleasing passenger experience while reducing energy consumption. A  atrium roof, inspired by the site's industrial heritage, will link the two halves of the station, and carry solar panels. The escalators linking the concourse to the platforms 13.5 m below will be the longest on the HS2 network. It is estimated that the station will serve 250,000 passengers per day and will ultimately connect with eight of the UK's largest cities.

Construction

The delivery of OOC is a joint venture between Balfour Beatty, Taylor Woodrow Construction and SYSTRA, which was awarded in September 2019.

To overcome the site's limited access along the single-carriageway Old Oak Common Lane, and reduce lorry movements across London, a -long conveyor belt will be assembled to transport the excavated material to Willesden Euro Terminal railhead, to be removed by rail freight and then recycled. At its peak, there will be 1,500 workers building the station.

Timeline 
Groundwork started on the site in 2019, following the completion of the consultation opened in February 2019. In  May 2020, the station gained planning permission. In June 2020, sheet piling commenced on site and the main works contractor for the station started work.

Permanent works began on site in June 2021, starting with the construction of 1.8 km-long underground walls which will form the underground station box for the HS2 platforms.

Planned services

The following table illustrates the planned range of services, based on current DfT documentation on the station, additional proposed serves are described in the following sub-sections.

The Business Case, released in 2020, suggests that every HS2 service that calls at London Euston will also call at Old Oak Common.

Journey times from Old Oak Common to Euston will be five minutes, to Birmingham Curzon Street 31minutes, and to Manchester Airport 56minutes.

Interchange proposals
Due to the proximity of the Old Oak Common site to other lines, it has been suggested that further connections could be made with commuter rail services.

Transit systems
However, no actual proposals exist to create an interchange with these lines.

London Overground stations
Transport for London (TfL) considered several options for creating an interchange with London Overground, including a combined North London/West London Line station on the southern side of the site, adjacent to Wormwood Scrubs,  and two separate stations located to the south (West London Line) and to the west (North London Line) of the site.

In October 2017, TfL began a public consultation on the construction of two new Overground stations.

In September 2017, a proposal was made for a new West London Orbital from Hounslow to Hendon using the disused Dudding Hill Line. If the scheme were to go ahead, London Overground services would run via Old Oak Common station located at Victoria Road and other new stations at Brent Cross West and Harlesden. Four trains per hour would run from Hendon to Hounslow and another service from Hendon to Kew Bridge via Old Oak Common. , the scheme was being considered by TfL.

Chiltern Main Line Connection
Network Rail has proposed that the Chiltern Main Line should have a second terminal at Old Oak Common to increase capacity on the route as there is no room to expand the station at Marylebone. To do so, services would use the Acton–Northolt line (formerly the "New North Main Line") with some Chiltern trains possibly terminating at Old Oak Common rather than Marylebone.

A 2017 Network Rail report on the long term plans for the Chiltern Line, included an option of providing additional platforms at Old Oak Common station area as a relief for Marylebone, with upgrading of the Acton-Northolt Line.

High Speed 1
Although the 2010 DfT proposal for HS2 outlined a number of other possible transport links at Old Oak Common, including the addition of a direct link with the High Speed 1 route to Mainland European services via the Channel Tunnel, it was removed following the Higgins Review 

Southern
TfL have stated that it will not be possible to construct platforms to accommodate Southern trains and that an interchange will not be provided.

Other proposals

The construction company Parsons Brinckerhoff submitted a detailed plan to High Speed 2 which included West London Line, North London Line, West Coast Main Line and Dudding Hill Line platforms, although this pre-dated the announcement of the HS2 London terminus such that their proposed alignment would not be possible.

Network Rail's London and South East Route Utilisation Strategy published in 2011 examines the possibility of constructing a chord through the Old Oak Common area to connect Crossrail to the West Coast Main Line. The report notes that a proportion of trains on the Elizabeth line service are planned to terminate at Paddington, and that a new western branch of Crossrail would enable those services to continue on towards  and beyond. The proposed link would also relieve pressure on Euston station by diverting WCML suburban trains onto the Crossrail route instead of terminating at Euston.

This scheme is not, however, supported by any government plans.

Political support
The Old Oak Common plans were unveiled two months before the 2010 United Kingdom general election by the Labour government. While the Conservative/Liberal Democrat administration supported the HS2 project, the Conservative Party has indicated a preference to an alternative proposal, put forward by Arup, for the HS2 line to go directly to a hub station at Heathrow Airport. Under this scheme, the west London interchange would be situated at Heathrow rather than at Old Oak Common. Conservative MP Theresa Villiers (the former Minister of State for Transport) referred to the Old Oak Common scheme as "Wormwood Scrubs International", and criticised it on account of its distance from the airport and the inconvenience to airport passengers having to change trains. The former Mayor of London, Boris Johnson has been non-committal in supporting the Old Oak Common site, and takes the view that further evaluation is required.

When asked about a High Speed Rail / Crossrail interchange at Old Oak Common, the Transport Secretary Philip Hammond stated "Lug your heavy bags down a couple of escalators along 600 m of corridor and then change trains at a wet suburban station somewhere in north west London. That is not an option.".

The Old Oak Common plans are supported by the London Borough of Hammersmith and Fulham.

That was because of tunnelling costs and possible fast turnaround times at Old Oak Common.

In summer 2011, Hammersmith and Fulham launched a wider 'Park Royal City' plan for Old Oak Common, including light rail or personal rapid transit lines to the surrounding areas.

See also
Old Oak Common Traction Maintenance Depot

References

External links

 a detailed map of Old Oak Common station is presented on Map 2: Route from West Kilburn to Park Royal - drawing number HS2-ARP-00-DR-RW-05002 (PDF, 10214KB)
 - official 2009 DfT map of the Old Oak Common site

 (promotional video by Hammersmith & Fulham Borough Council)

Crossrail
High Speed 2
Proposed rail infrastructure in London
Proposed buildings and structures in the United Kingdom
Proposed railway stations in London